The Sobaek Mountains are a mountain range cutting across the southern Korean peninsula. They split off from the Taebaek Mountains and trend southwest across the center of the peninsula. They are traditionally considered to reach their southwestern limit at Jirisan, which is also the highest peak of the range. Other famous mountains in the range include Songni Mountain, Joryeong Mountain, Gaya Mountain, Worak Mountain, and Sobaek Mountain itself. The peaks of the Sobaek Mountains are generally well over 1000 m above sea level.  

The Sobaek Mountains form the southern half of the Baekdudaegan, the symbolic "spine" of Korea. They mark the traditional border between the Honam and Yeongnam regions.

References

See also
Baekdudaegan
Geography of South Korea
List of mountains in Korea

 
Mountain ranges of South Korea